Zvi Rosen (born 23 June 1947) is an Israeli former international footballer who competed at the 1970 FIFA World Cup, as well as at the 1968 Summer Olympics.

Rosen played in 42 official games for the Israeli national side.

References

1947 births
Living people
Israeli footballers
Maccabi Tel Aviv F.C. players
Hapoel Yehud F.C. players
Liga Leumit players
Israel international footballers
1968 AFC Asian Cup players
1970 FIFA World Cup players
Footballers from Cologne
Israeli people of German-Jewish descent
German emigrants to Mandatory Palestine
Olympic footballers of Israel
Footballers at the 1968 Summer Olympics
Asian Games silver medalists for Israel
Asian Games medalists in football
Association football defenders
Footballers at the 1974 Asian Games
Medalists at the 1974 Asian Games
Israeli Footballer of the Year recipients